Mersiha Aščerić is a Bosnian football defender currently playing in the Bosnian Championship for SFK 2000 Sarajevo, with which she has also played the Champions League. She has been a member of the Bosnian national team for over a decade, and she currently serves as its captain.

References

1978 births
Living people
Bosnia and Herzegovina women's footballers
Women's association football defenders
Bosnia and Herzegovina women's international footballers